The Webster Memorial Building is a historic house at 36 Trumbull Street in downtown Hartford, Connecticut.  Built in 1870 and extensively restyled in 1924, it is a rare example of Georgian Revival architecture in the downtown area, noted for its historical association with the Family Services Society, a prominent local charity.  The building, now in other commercial use, was listed on the National Register of Historic Places in 1982.

Description and history
The Webster Memorial Building stands at the northeast corner of Trumbull and Jewell Streets on the west side of Hartford's downtown area, facing one of the main entrances to Bushnell Park.  It is a three-story brick building, with a flat roof and decorative wooden carved cornice.  The main facade is five bays wide, with most windows set in rectangular openings with brownstone sills and lintels.  The main entrance is recessed in the center bay, framed by a projecting portico supported by paired Corinthian columns.  The columns support a frieze in which the building name is carved, above which are a cornice and a step with a pair of urns.  The bay above the entrance houses a window that is flanked by pilasters and topped by a broken segmented-arch pediment.

The building was constructed in 1870, and was originally a private three-unit apartment house.  Its design was in the then-popular Italianate style, with a bracketed cornice.  In 1925 it was purchased by the Charity Organization Society, a philanthropic organization founded in 1890.  The society's purchase was funded by a bequest from John Webster, a local insurance executive.  The society undertook the remodelling of the building for its use, hiring the local firm of Allen and Collins, best known for their work on the Hartford Theological Seminary, who are credited with this building's present exterior appearance.  The society, now known as the Family Services Society, has played a leading role in social service endeavours of other local charities since its inception.

See also
National Register of Historic Places listings in Hartford, Connecticut

References

Houses on the National Register of Historic Places in Connecticut
National Register of Historic Places in Hartford, Connecticut
Houses completed in 1870
Houses in Hartford, Connecticut